Eastern Manitoba, or the Eastman Region, is an informal geographic region of the Canadian province of Manitoba. It is bounded on the north by the Winnipeg River and Lake Winnipeg, on the east by the Manitoba-Ontario border, on the south by the Canada–US border, and on the west by the Red River.

The city of Steinbach is the largest population centre in the region. The Trans-Canada Highway runs through the middle of the Eastman Region.

Major communities
Urban municipalities:

 Beausejour (town)
 Lac du Bonnet (town)
 Niverville (town)
 Pinawa (local government district)
 Powerview–Pine Falls (town)
 St-Pierre-Jolys (village)
 Ste. Anne (town)
 Steinbach (city)

Unorganized areas:

 Unorganized Division 1

Rural municipalities

First Nations and Indian reserves 

 Animakee Wa Zhing 37
 Buffalo Point
 Iskatewizaagegan 39

 Roseau River Anishinabe (Roseau Rapids 2A and Roseau River 2)
 Shoal Lake 37A
 Shoal Lake 39
 Shoal Lake 39A
 Shoal Lake 40

Points of interest 
Other

 Great Falls Generating Station
 Underground Research Laboratory
 Whiteshell Laboratories

Parks, forestry, and landforms 

 Agassiz Provincial Forest
 Atikaki Provincial Wilderness Park
 Belair Provincial Forest
 Birch Point Provincial Park
 Birds Hill Provincial Park
 Brightstone Sand Hills Provincial Forest
 Cat Hills Provincial Forest
 Elk Island Provincial Park
 Grand Beach Provincial Park
 Lee River Wildlife Management Area
 Manigotagan River Provincial Park
 Nopiming Provincial Park
 Pinawa Dam Provincial Park
 Poplar Bay Provincial Park
 Sandilands Provincial Forest
 St. Malo Provincial Park
 Wampum Provincial Forest
 Whitemouth Bog Ecological Reserve
 Whiteshell Provincial Park and Forest

Bodies of water

 Lake Winnipeg
 Lee River
 Manigotagan River
 Roseau River
 Seine River
 Winnipeg River

Transport 

 Bird River (Lac du Bonnet) Airport
 Bird River Water Aerodrome
 Lac du Bonnet Airport
 Lac du Bonnet (North) Water Aerodrome
 Manitoba Highway 11
 Manitoba Provincial Road 304
 Silver Falls Airport
 Silver Falls Water Aerodrome
 Lancaster–Tolstoi Border Crossing
 Pinecreek–Piney Border Crossing
 Roseau–South Junction Border Crossing
 Warroad–Sprague Border Crossing

External links
 Eastman Regional Profile
Community Profile: Census Division No. 1, Manitoba; Statistics Canada
Community Profile: Census Division No. 2, Manitoba; Statistics Canada
Community Profile: Census Division No. 12, Manitoba; Statistics Canada

 
Geographic regions of Manitoba